Mark Levy may refer to:
 Mark I. Levy, American lawyer
 Mark Levy (rugby league), Australian rugby league player
 Mark Levy (reporter), American journalist